Kokaman (also, Coc-co-man, Coc-ko-nan, Cock-o-mans, and Cok-ka-mans) is a former Karok settlement in Humboldt County, California. It was located on the Klamath River; its precise location is unknown.

References

Former settlements in Humboldt County, California
Former Native American populated places in California
Karuk villages
Lost Native American populated places in the United States